Federici is a surname. Notable people with the surname include:

Aldo Federici (born 1920), Italian ice hockey player
Adam Federici (born 1985), Australian footballer
Anthony Federici (born 1940), identified as a captain in the Genovese crime family
Autumn Federici, American model, producer, and actress
Camillo Federici (1749-1802), Italian actor and playwright
Cesare Federici (c. 1530-1600/1603), Italian merchant and traveler
Daniele Federici (born 1988), Italian footballer
Daniel Paul "Danny" Federici (1950–2008), American musician
Emanuele Federici (born 1978), Italian lightweight rower
Frederick Federici (1850–1888), Italian-born British opera singer
Giovanni Battista Federici (1615–1657), Roman Catholic prelate, Bishop of Sagone  
Italia Federici, President of the Council of Republicans for Environmental Advocacy
Nora Federici (1910–2001), Italian statistician
Olivia Federici (born 1990), British swimmer
Petrus Federici (1571–1613), Roman Catholic prelate, Bishop of Vulturara e Montecorvino 
Silvia Federici (born 1942), Italian American scholar, teacher, and activist

Italian-language surnames
Patronymic surnames
Surnames from given names